James Grant Wilson (April 28, 1832 – February 1, 1914) was an American editor, author, bookseller and publisher, who founded the Chicago Record in 1857, the first literary paper in that region. During the American Civil War, he served as a colonel in the Union Army. In recognition of his service, in 1867, he was nominated and confirmed for appointment as a brevet brigadier general of volunteers to rank from March 13, 1865. He settled in New York, where he edited biographies and histories, was a public speaker, and served as president of the Society of American Authors and the New York Genealogical and Biographical Society.

Early life
James Grant Wilson was born on April 28, 1832 in Edinburgh, Scotland, the son of the poet William Wilson and his second wife, Miss Jane Sibbald of Hawick. In infancy, he moved with his family to the United States, where they settled at Poughkeepsie, New York. He had two younger brothers. Wilson was educated in Poughkeepsie at College Hill, and continued his studies in the languages, music, and drawing, under private teachers.

Career
Eventually, he joined his father in business as a bookseller/publisher, later becoming his partner.  In 1855, Wilson started on an extended journey, his tour of Europe and its capitals. Upon his return in 1857, he settled in the growing city of Chicago, Illinois, where he founded the Chicago Record, a journal of art and literature. It was the first literary paper published in that region. He also became known as a speaker.

U.S. Civil War
During the Civil War, Wilson sold his journal and entered the Union Army late in 1862. He was commissioned as a major of the 15th Illinois Cavalry, commanded the 4th U.S.C. Cavalry as colonel. He resigned from the Army on June 16, 1865. On February 27, 1867, President Andrew Johnson nominated Wilson for appointment to the grade of brevet brigadier general of volunteers to rank from March 13, 1865, and the United States Senate confirmed the appointment on March 2, 1867.  His middle brother was killed at Fredericksburg, Virginia, and his youngest brother also served.

Later career
After the war, Wilson settled in New York City. He became known as a speaker, a frequent contributor to periodicals, president of the Society of American Authors, and, after 1885, of the New York Genealogical and Biographical Society. He edited Fitz-Greene Halleck's Poems (1868) and wrote his biography, published in 1869; and in 1876 his  anthology Poets & Poetry of Scotland  in four volumes .

Personal life
On November 3, 1869, he married Jane Emily Searle Cogswell (d. 1904), the sister of Andrew Kirkpatrick Cogswell (1839-1900) and the daughter of Rev. Jonathan Cogswell (1781–1864) and Jane Eudora Kirkpatrick (1799–1864). Jane's grandfather was Andrew Kirkpatrick (1756–1831) and her great-grandfather was John Bayard (1738–1807). Before her death in 1904, they had one daughter together:

 Jane Wilson, who married Frank Sylvester Henry (who died before 1914)

After his first wife's death in 1904, he married Mary H. Nicholson, the widow of his friend Admiral James William Augustus Nicholson, in 1907. He resided at 143 West 79th Street in New York City.

Wilson died in New York City and is buried in Woodlawn Cemetery, Bronx, New York.

Selected works

 Biographical Sketches of Illinois Officers (1862–63)
 Life of Fitz-Greene Halleck (1869)
 Sketches of Illustrious Soldiers (1874)
 Poets and Poetry of Scotland (1876) (in four volumes) Blackie & Son, Edinburgh 1876
 Centennial History of the Diocese of New York, 1775-1885 (1886)
 Bryant and his Friends (1886)
 Commodore Isaac Hull and the Frigate Constitution (1889)

 Love in Letters (1896)
 Life of General Grant (1897)
 Thackeray in the United States'' (two volumes, 1904)

See also

List of American Civil War brevet generals (Union)

References
Notes

Sources

External links

Union Army colonels
Writers from New York City
People of Illinois in the American Civil War
19th-century American novelists
20th-century American novelists
19th-century American historians
American male novelists
American military writers
1832 births
1914 deaths
Writers from Chicago
Burials at Woodlawn Cemetery (Bronx, New York)
Lecturers
20th-century American biographers
19th-century American male writers
20th-century American male writers
Novelists from New York (state)
Novelists from Illinois
Historians from New York (state)
Historians from Illinois
Historians of New York City
American male biographers